NITK Beach is situated in Surathkal, the northern part of Mangalore city, Karnataka. This beach is also known as Surathkal beach. It is a private beach that was later named after the nearby NITK (National Institute of Technology, Karnataka). 

A lighthouse constructed in the year 1972 is very near to this beach.

Educational Institutions nearby
National Institute of Technology Karnataka, Surathkal, Mangalore
Srinivas Institute of Medical Sciences and Research Centre, Mukka, Mangalore
Srinivas Institute of Dental Sciences, Mukka, Mangalore
Srinivas University College of Engineering & Technology (SUCET), Mukka, Mangalore

Hospitals
Srinivas Hospital, Mukka, Mangalore
Padmavathi Hospital, Surathkal, Mangalore
Venus Hospital, Surathkal, Mangalore
Atharva Hospital, Surathkal, Mangalore

Accessibility 
NITK Beach is well connected by public transport. There are several city buses(2,2A,41) from the main bus stop in statebank. One can also take the non-express service buses that give a stop for NITK Beach at NITK. Once off the bus, one can take 15 mins walk to reach. 

Distance from:
Surathkal, Mangalore - 5 km
Panambur Beach, Mangalore - 8 km
New Mangalore Port, Mangalore- 10 km
Tannirbhavi Beach, Mangalore- 15 km
Kadri Park, Mangalore - 16 km
Pumpwell, Mangalore - 20 km
Pilikula Nisargadhama, Mangalore - 22 km
Infosys DC, Mudipu, Mangalore - 37 km
Manipal - 51 km
Malpe- 52 km
Dharmasthala - 84 km
Kukke Subramanya Temple - 118 km

Nearest Railway Stations:
Surathkal railway station, Surathkal, Mangalore - 4 km
Mangalore Central railway station, Hampankatta, Mangalore - 20 km
Mangalore Junction railway station, Padil, Mangalore - 21 km

Nearest Airport:
 Mangalore International Airport (India) - 19 km

Climate 
Mangalore has a tropical monsoon climate and is under the direct influence of the Arabian Sea branch of the southwest monsoon.

Accidents 
This beach is notorious for drowning accidents since 2000s

 NIT Warangal girl drowned here on 21 January, 2020
 SVIT student in final year drowned in 2008

See also 
 Surathkal
 Panambur Beach
 Tannirbhavi Beach
 Ullal beach
 Someshwar Beach
 Pilikula Nisargadhama
 Kadri Park
 Tagore Park
 Bejai Museum
 Aloyseum

References

Beaches of Mangalore